Dillwynia divaricata is a species of flowering plant in the family Fabaceae and is endemic to the south-west of Western Australia. It is an erect, spindly shrub with cylindrical, grooved leaves and yellow flowers with brownish markings.

Description
Flowering mainly occurs from February to May.

Taxonomy and naming
This species was first formally described in 1853 by Nikolai Turczaninow in the Bulletin de la Societe Imperiale des Naturalistes de Moscou and was given the name Eutaxia divaricata. In 1864, George Bentham changed the name to Dillwynia divaricata in Flora Australiensis.

Distribution
Dillwynia divaricata grows in sandy soil on flat areas in the Avon Wheatbelt, Coolgardie, Esperance Plains and Mallee biogeographic regions of south-western Western Australia.

Conservation status
This species is classified as "not threatened" by the Government of Western Australia Department of Parks and Wildlife.

References

divaricata
Eudicots of Western Australia
Taxa named by Nikolai Turczaninow
Plants described in 1853